Ricardo de Burgos Bengoetxea (born 16 March 1986) is a Spanish football referee who officiates in La Liga. He has been a FIFA referee since 2018, and is ranked as a UEFA first category referee.

Refereeing career
In 2011, De Burgos Bengoetxea began officiating in the Segunda División, and in 2015 he was promoted to La Liga, the top division of Spanish football. His first match as referee was on 23 August 2015 between Levante and Celta Vigo. In 2017, he officiated the first leg of the 2017 Supercopa de España between Barcelona and Real Madrid. In 2018, he was put on the FIFA referees list. He officiated his first senior international match on 10 October 2019 in UEFA Euro 2020 qualifying between Belarus and Estonia.

Personal life
De Burgos Bengoetxea is a native of Bilbao, and works as a dental technician.

References

External links
 
 Profile at EU-Football.info

1986 births
Living people
Sportspeople from Bilbao
Spanish football referees
21st-century Spanish people